Laurence G. Hanscom Field , commonly known as Hanscom Field, is a public use airport operated by the Massachusetts Port Authority, located  outside Boston in Bedford, Massachusetts, United States.

Hanscom is mainly a general aviation airport, the largest in New England. Both runways can accommodate jets, and are used by Hanscom Air Force Base, a defense-research facility next to Hanscom Field. It is a popular training airport, with more than 40 rental aircraft on the field. The Civil Air Terminal building hosts two flight schools. Transient general aviation planes are served by three FBOs: Jet Aviation, Rectrix Aviation, and Signature Flight Support. 

It is also used sometimes by the Boston Bruins, Boston Celtics and Boston Red Sox, instead of Logan International Airport, for their charter flights to and from away contests. 

Federal Aviation Administration records say the airport had 10,956 passenger boardings (enplanements) in calendar year 2017. It is in the National Plan of Integrated Airport Systems for 2021–2025, in which the FAA categories it as a non-primary commercial service airport (between 2,500 and 10,000 enplanements per year).

The field serves aircraft from Piper Cubs to Gulfstream V jets. The events of September 11 caused a number of changes to general aviation in the US (see Airport security repercussions due to the September 11 attacks). Hanscom Field saw changes implemented by Massport that included security fees, identification cards, and a requirement for propeller locks.

Facilities and aircraft

It has two asphalt runways:

Runway 11/29 is 
Runway 5/23 is 

In the year ending September 30, 2021 the airport had 99,961 aircraft operations, an average of 274 per day: 81% general aviation, 18% air taxi, less than 1% military and less than 1% scheduled commercial. In April 2022, there were 252 aircraft based at this airport: 146 single-engine, 20 multi-engine, 75 jet and 11 helicopter.

In 2008, and many years prior, Hanscom had handled the second most aircraft movements of any airport in New England after Boston-Logan. On a nice weekend day the traffic pattern gets so busy the tower is known to close the traffic pattern and only allow full stop landings.

Hanscom Field's traffic is primarily business jets and general aviation aircraft. Massport assesses a nighttime field use fee for takeoffs or landings conducted outside of the tower operating hours.

Airlines and destinations
Under Massport regulations adopted in 1980 (Part F of the General Rules and Regulations for Laurence G. Hanscom Field), scheduled commercial operations are limited to aircraft with up to 60 seats.

Shuttle America, a Connecticut-based regional airline, operated scheduled service from the airfield from 1999 until 2004, carrying more than 10,000 passengers each month to Buffalo, New York; Hartford, Connecticut; New York LaGuardia; Trenton, New Jersey; and Greensboro, North Carolina, using De Havilland Dash 8-300 aircraft. In 2001 Shuttle America became a US Airways Express feeder carrier on behalf of US Airways providing service to Philadelphia and Trenton until service ended in 2004. De Havilland Dash 8 and Saab 340 aircraft were used in the latter years.

Boston-Maine Airways, dba Pan Am Clipper Connection began servicing the airport in 2002 using Jetstream 31 aircraft. Clipper flights connected Hanscom Field with Pease Airport in Portsmouth, New Hampshire, and Trenton–Mercer Airport in New Jersey. In its final years, Clipper added flights from Hanscom to Ithaca-Tompkins Regional Airport in Central New York. Even with this new route, Clipper could never draw the numbers it needed to remain profitable. The airline was forced to cease operation in 2008 by the FAA for lack of funding and management. That left Hanscom Field without scheduled airline service for the first time in a decade.

In 2011, Trenton-based airline Streamline Air began its first public charter route to Hanscom using 30-seat Embraer EMB 120 Brasilia aircraft, beginning with two daily round trips on weekdays. Streamline ceased operations on September 15, 2012.

In the spring of 2021, Southern Airways Express announced that they were replacing their Hyannis-Nantucket route with a Bedford/Hanscom Field-Nantucket route beginning May 26, 2021. This was the first scheduled passenger service out of Hanscom Field in almost a decade.

At the beginning of year 2023 Magellan Jets opened its first private jet terminal at Laurence G. Hanscom Field (BED) airport in the country.

Cargo

Notable events at Hanscom Field
On 8 August 1962, a U.S. Air Force Boeing KC-135 Stratotanker, a modified former tanker, crashed on approach to Hanscom Field's runway 11, destroying the aircraft and killing all three members of the flight crew.

In September 1964, The Beatles arrived at Hanscom Field aboard a chartered aircraft during one of their American concert tours. They were making an appearance at Boston Garden the following day. It was felt that the immense popularity of the British singing group would cause congestion at Boston-Logan International Airport, so this alternative airport was selected.

On 24 November 1988, George Koskotas, who fled Greece after being indicted on five counts of forgery and embezzlement, was apprehended by the FBI at Hanscom Field after landing in a private jet with his family.

On 31 May 2014, a private Gulfstream IV business jet crashed and caught fire beyond the end of runway 11 following an aborted take off from Hanscom Field, killing all seven people on board. A preliminary NTSB report suggests that the flight controls were locked, preventing the aircraft from rotating to take off. Lewis Katz, co-owner of the Philadelphia Inquirer, the Philadelphia Daily News, and Philly.com, was among the dead.

On June 2, 2017, actor Harrison Ford landed at Hanscom prior to spending the weekend in Boston.

Movies/scenes filmed at Hanscom Field
 What's The Worst That Could Happen? (2001)
 The Pink Panther 2 (2009)
 Paul Blart: Mall Cop (2009) 
 Edge of Darkness (2010)

References

External links

 Massport: Hanscom Field
 Aerial image as of March 1995 from USGS The National Map
 
 
 East Coast Aero Club
 

Massachusetts Port Authority
Bedford, Massachusetts
Airports in Middlesex County, Massachusetts
Superfund sites in Massachusetts